Walton Windmill may refer to a number of windmills in the United Kingdom.

Savage's Mill, Walton on the Naze, Essex
Archer's Mill, Walton on the Naze, Essex
Stanley Park Mill, Walton, Liverpool, Lancashire
Upper Mill, Walton, Suffolk
Wadgate Mill, Walton, Suffolk
Walton on Thames windmill, Surrey